The term Croatian nationalism may refer to:

 Croatian nationalism or Croat nationalism, a form of Ethnic nationalism that asserts that Croats are a nation and promotes the national unity of Croats.
 Croatian nationalism, a form of Territorial nationalism that asserts that all citizens of Croatia constitute a nation and promotes the national unity of Croatia.

See also
 Slavic nationalism (disambiguation)
 Latin nationalism (disambiguation)
 Turkic nationalism (disambiguation)